Regina Wascana Plains is a provincial electoral district for the Legislative Assembly of Saskatchewan, Canada. At different points in time, this district included the Regina neighbourhoods of University Park, University Park East, Arcola East-South Side, Varsity Park, Wood Meadows, Woodland Grove, Wascana View, Wascana Crescents and Wascana Park. It also includes the town of White City.

Members of the Legislative Assembly

Election results

|-

 
|NDP
|Pat Maze
|align="right"|2,895
|align="right"|26.89
|align="right"|-4.39

 
|Prog. Conservative
|Roy Gaebel
|align="right"|195
|align="right"|1.81
|align="right"|-
|- bgcolor="white"
!align="left" colspan=3|Total
!align="right"|10,765
!align="right"|100.00
!align="right"|

|-

 
|NDP
|Tyler Forrest
|align="right"|3,450
|align="right"|31.28
|align="right"|-12.10

|- bgcolor="white"
!align="left" colspan=3|Total
!align="right"|11,031
!align="right"|100.00
!align="right"|

|-
 
| style="width: 130px" |NDP
|Doreen E. Hamilton
|align="right"|3,951
|align="right"|43.38
|align="right"|+3.14

|- bgcolor="white"
!align="left" colspan=3|Total
!align="right"|9,108
!align="right"|100.00
!align="right"|

|-
 
| style="width: 130px" |NDP
|Doreen E. Hamilton
|align="right"|3,758
|align="right"|40.24
|align="right"|-7.56

|- bgcolor="white"
!align="left" colspan=3|Total
!align="right"|9,340
!align="right"|100.00
!align="right"|

|-
 
| style="width: 130px" |NDP
|Doreen E. Hamilton
|align="right"|3,862
|align="right"|47.80
|align="right"|+1.40

 
|Prog. Conservative
|Bonnie Krajewski
|align="right"|691
|align="right"|8.55
|align="right"|-13.45
|- bgcolor="white"
!align="left" colspan=3|Total
!align="right"|8,080
!align="right"|100.00
!align="right"|

|-
 
| style="width: 130px" |NDP
|Doreen E. Hamilton
|align="right"|4,532
|align="right"|46.40
|align="right"|+5.10

 
|Prog. Conservative
|Gordon Martin
|align="right"|2,148
|align="right"|22.00
|align="right"|-19.75
|- bgcolor="white"
!align="left" colspan=3|Total
!align="right"|9,766
!align="right"|100.00
!align="right"|

References

External links 
Website of the Legislative Assembly of Saskatchewan
Elections Saskatchewan: Official Results of the 2007 Provincial Election By Electoral Division
Elections Saskatchewan - Official Results of the 2011 Provincial Election
Saskatchewan Archives Board – Saskatchewan Election Results By Electoral Division

Politics of Regina, Saskatchewan
Saskatchewan provincial electoral districts